Coccocarpia elegans is a species of lichenized fungi in the family Coccocarpiaceae. A specimen kept at Geneva city herbarium was collected in 1881 in Apiahy, Brazil.

References

Peltigerales
Lichen species
Fungi described in 1881
Taxa named by Johannes Müller Argoviensis